Giles Thomson (Tomson, Thompson) (1553–1612) was an English academic and bishop.

Life
He was born in London, and educated at Merchant Taylors' School, and to University College, Oxford where he matriculated in 1571.  He became a Fellow of All Souls College in 1580, and Divinity Reader at Magdalen College. Queen Elizabeth made him one of her chaplains.

He became Dean of Windsor in 1602, and took part in the Hampton Court Conference of 1604. He was a translator for the King James Bible, a member of the Second Oxford Company.

He became Bishop of Gloucester in 1611, but died before visiting the see. There is a monument to him in the Chapel of St George, Windsor.

References

Bishops of Gloucester
17th-century Church of England bishops
Translators of the King James Version
1553 births
1612 deaths
People of the Elizabethan era
Fellows of All Souls College, Oxford
Alumni of University College, Oxford
Deans of Windsor
Anglican clergy from London
16th-century translators
17th-century translators
16th-century English clergy